Greece participated in the Eurovision Song Contest 2019 with the song "Better Love" written by Katerine Duska, Leon of Athens, David Sneddon and Phil Cook. The song was performed by Duska, who was internally selected by the Greek broadcaster Hellenic Broadcasting Corporation (ERT) to represent Greece at the 2019 contest in Tel Aviv, Israel. She was announced as the Greek representative on 14 February 2019, while her song "Better Love" was presented on 6 March 2019.

To promote the entry, a music video for the song was created and Duska appeared at events in Amsterdam and Madrid. Greece was drawn to compete in the first semi-final of the Eurovision Song Contest which took place on 14 May 2019. Performing during the show in position 16, "Better Love" was announced among the top 10 entries of the first semi-final and therefore qualified to compete in the final on 18 May. It was later revealed that Greece placed fifth out of the 17 participating countries in the semi-final with 185 points. In the final, Greece performed in position 13 and placed twenty-first out of the 26 participating countries, scoring 74 points.

Background 

Between 2004 and 2013, the nation achieved nine top ten placements in the final. -entrant Argo with their song "Utopian Land" failed to qualify the nation to the final for the first time ever, marking Greece's worst result at the contest and leading to their absence from the final for the first time since 2000, a contest they did not take part in. In the  the year prior, Greece failed to qualify for the second time with Yianna Terzi and the song "" finishing 14th in the semi-final. 

The Greek national broadcaster, Hellenic Broadcasting Corporation (ERT), broadcasts the event within Greece and organises the selection process for the nation's entry. ERT had been in charge of Greece's participation in the contest since their debut in 1974 until 2013 when the broadcaster was shutdown by a government directive and replaced firstly with the interim  (DT) and then later by the New Hellenic Radio, Internet and Television (NERIT) broadcaster. Following the victory of the  party at the January 2015 Greek legislative election, the Hellenic Parliament re-instated ERT as the public Greek broadcaster by the renaming of NERIT as ERT, which began broadcasting in June 2015. The Greek broadcaster has used various methods to select the Greek entry in the past, such as internal selections and televised national finals to choose the performer, song or both to compete at Eurovision. The Greek artist and song in 2018 was selected via an internal selection.

Before Eurovision

Internal selection 

On 3 January 2019, the ERT announced that they would be selecting their act and song internally. An eight-member artistic committee was involved with the selection of the entrant and consisted of chairman, music composer and ERT board member Dimitris Papadimitriou, journalist Fotis Apergis, ERT Director of International Relations Maria Koufopoulou, ERT Head of European and International Affairs Sofia Dranidou, and music producers Petros Adam and Yiannis Petridis. Their selection of Greek-Canadian singer Katerine Duska as the Greek representative for the 2019 contest was confirmed by ERT on 14 February. Her song "Better Love", was then presented on 6 March through a special event held at the Athens Concert Hall. The official music video, filmed in Athens and directed by Efi Gousi, was also screened at the event. "Better Love" was written by Duska herself together with Leon of Athens, David Sneddon and Phil Cook. In regards to the song, Duska stated: "I wanted to write a song that would sound like an invitation, feel like an embrace. A tender song with a fighting spirit about a word we profusely use, but rarely actually mean. It really is the way to love, whomever you love."

Promotion 
In addition to releasing a music video for "Better Love", Duska made several appearances across Europe to specifically promote the song as the Greek Eurovision entry. On 6 April, Duska performed during the Eurovision in Concert event which was held at the AFAS Live venue in Amsterdam, Netherlands and hosted by Cornald Maas and Marlayne. She also performed during the Eurovision Pre-Party Madrid event on 21 April which was held at the Sala La Riviera venue in Madrid, Spain and hosted by Tony Aguilar and Julia Varela.

At Eurovision 
The Eurovision Song Contest 2019 took place at Expo Tel Aviv in Tel Aviv, Israel. It consisted of two semi-finals held on 14 and 16 May, respectively, and the final on 18 May 2019. According to Eurovision rules, all nations with the exceptions of the host country and the "Big Five" (France, Germany, Italy, Spain and the United Kingdom) are required to qualify from one of two semi-finals in order to compete for the final; the top ten countries from each semi-final progress to the final. The European Broadcasting Union (EBU) split up the competing countries into six different pots based on voting patterns from previous contests, with countries with favourable voting histories put into the same pot. On 28 January 2019, a special allocation draw was held which placed each country into one of the two semi-finals, as well as which half of the show they would perform in. Greece was placed into the first semi-final, held on 14 May 2019, and was scheduled to perform in the second half of the show. Once all the competing songs for the 2019 contest had been released, the running order for the semi-finals was decided by the shows' producers rather than through another draw, so that similar songs were not placed next to each other. Greece was set to perform in position 16, following the entry from Portugal and before the entry from San Marino. The two semi-finals and the final were televised in Greece on ERT2 and ERT HD with commentary by Maria Kozakou and Giorgos Kapoutzidis. The first semi-final and the final were also broadcast via radio on Voice of Greece and Second Programme.

Performances
Katerine Duska took part in technical rehearsals on 5 and 10 May, followed by dress rehearsals on 13 and 14 May. This included the jury show on 13 May where the professional juries of each country watched and voted on the competing entries in the first semi-final. Duska appeared on stage in a white dress with a line of pearls braided in her hair and performing together on stage with five backing vocalists/dancers. The stage presentation featured an ancient Greek fountain-like prop which was later turned to reveal a wall of flowers. Two of the backing performers held swords in each of their hands and performed synchronised ballet and contemporary dance moves, while the other three backing performers interacted with the staging by lying down on the stage floor. The LED screens projected a lotus background. The performance was choreographed by Efi Gousi who also directed the music video of "Better Love". The backing performers that performed with Duska on stage were Dimitra Vlachou, Eleni Pozantzidou, Erasmia Markidi, Evgenia Liakou and Fania Grigoriou. At the end of the show, Greece was announced as having finished in the top 10 and subsequently qualifying for the final. It was later revealed that Greece placed fifth in the semi-final, receiving a total of 185 points: 54 points from the televoting and 131 points from the juries.

Shortly after the first semi-final, a winners' press conference was held for the ten qualifying countries. As part of this press conference, the qualifying artists took part in a draw to determine which half of the final they would subsequently participate in. This draw was done in the order the countries were announced during the semi-final. Greece was drawn to compete in the second half. Following this draw, the shows' producers decided upon the running order of the final, as they had done for the semi-finals. Greece was subsequently placed to perform in position 13, following the entry from the Netherlands and before the entry from Israel. Duska once again took part in dress rehearsals on 17 and 18 May before the final, including the jury final where the professional juries cast their final votes before the live show. At the 18 May final, Greece placed 21st, scoring 74 points: 24 points from the televoting and 50 points from the juries. Following the contest, ERT reported high viewership of the final, with a 50.2% share of television viewers on a combination of their ERT2 and ERT HD broadcasts and 4,125,544 viewers watching for at least one minute.

Voting
Voting during the three shows involved each country awarding two sets of points from 1-8, 10 and 12: one from their professional jury and the other from televoting. Each nation's jury consisted of five music industry professionals who are citizens of the country they represent, with their names published before the contest to ensure transparency. This jury judged each entry based on: vocal capacity; the stage performance; the song's composition and originality; and the overall impression by the act. In addition, no member of a national jury was permitted to be related in any way to any of the competing acts in such a way that they cannot vote impartially and independently. The individual rankings of each jury member as well as the nation's televoting results were released shortly after the final. The Greek spokesperson, who announced the top 12-point score awarded by the Greek jury during the final, was heavy metal guitarist Gus G. Below is a breakdown of points awarded to Greece and awarded by Greece in the first semi-final and final of the contest, and the breakdown of the jury voting and televoting conducted during the two shows:

Points awarded to Greece

Points awarded by Greece

Detailed voting results
The following members comprised the Greek jury:
 Nikolaos Nikolakopoulos (Nikos; jury chairperson)programme director radio station
 Eirini Karagianniopera singer
 Emmanouil Pantelidakiscostume and set designer
 Stella Chroneousinger, vocal coach
 actor, performer

References 

2019
Countries in the Eurovision Song Contest 2019
Eurovision